Max Salzmann was a  German designer at the Schelter & Giesecke Type Foundry. He immigrated to the United States.

Fonts Designed 
All of these faces were produced by the Schelter & Giesecke Type Foundry.
 Dolmen (1922) An art deco face. Digitized by Nick Curtis (Salzmann Deco NF, 2011).  There are also versions of Dolmen by Linotype (1987), Letraset and ITC.
 Zierdolmen (1922), a decorated version of Dolmen. Digitized by Nick Curtis (Salzmann Deco Deco NF, 2011).
 Kalender Vignetten (1907) 
 Salzmann Antiqua (1913)
 Salzmann Fraktur + Kräftige Salzmann Fraktur (1912) A digital versions were made by Ralph M. Unger (Salzmann Fraktur, 2019), Delbanco (DS-Salzmann-Fraktur, 2001), and Chiron (TbC Salzmann Fraktur, 2012). 
 Salzmann Kursiv (1911)
 Salzmannschrift + Salzmannschrift halbfette + schmale Salzmannschrift (1910)

References

German graphic designers
German typographers and type designers